Gerardus "Gerard" Maarse (1 March 1929 – 27 December 1989) was a Dutch speed skater who competed in the 1952 Winter Olympics and in the 1956 Winter Olympics.

He was born in Wilnis and died in Ermelo.

In 1952 he finished eighth in the 500 metres competition and twelfth in the 1500 metres event.

Four years later he finished eleventh in the 1500 metres contest, 18th in the 5000 metres competition, and 22nd in the 500 metres contest at the 1956 Games.

External links
 

1929 births
1989 deaths
Dutch male speed skaters
Olympic speed skaters of the Netherlands
People from De Ronde Venen
Speed skaters at the 1952 Winter Olympics
Speed skaters at the 1956 Winter Olympics
Sportspeople from Utrecht (province)